Gillespie Cave is located east of Nashville in Antioch, TN.

Caves of Tennessee
Landforms of Davidson County, Tennessee